Schönebeck, officially Schönebeck (Elbe), is a town in the district of Salzlandkreis, in Saxony-Anhalt, Germany. It is situated on the left bank of the Elbe, approx.  southeast of Magdeburg.

For much of the twentieth century it was noted for its large salt mine.

The manor house of Schönebeck was owned by Count Heinrich von Blumenthal, Mayor of Magdeburg, until 1810.

The firm of Sellier & Bellot opened a munitions factory there in the 1829.

Geography 
The town Schönebeck consists of Schönebeck proper and three Ortschaften or municipal divisions, that were independent municipalities until January 2009, when they were absorbed into Schönebeck:
Plötzky
Pretzien
Ranies

Twin towns – sister cities

Schönebeck is twinned with:
 Garbsen, Germany
 Söke, Turkey
 Trakai, Lithuania

Schönebeck also have friendly relations with Farmers Branch, Texas, United States.

Notable people
 

Christoph Grabinski (born 1990), footballer
Katharina Heise (1891–1964), sculptor, painter and printmaker
Erik Neutsch (1931–2013), writer

See also
Schönebeck (Verwaltungsgemeinschaft)

References

External links

Towns in Saxony-Anhalt
Salzlandkreis
Populated riverside places in Germany
Populated places on the Elbe